The Oxgangs tower blocks (known locally at the Oxgangs high rise flats) were a group of 3 tower blocks which were built on Firrhill Drive/Oxgangs Crescent in 1961 and 1962. They each contained a mixture of flats and maisonettes with 2 bedrooms each, totalling up to 80 homes per block. The blocks were called "Allermuir Court" "Caerketton Court" and "Capelaw Court", and were named after three of the nearby Pentland Hills.

The original name of the group of three blocks was "Comiston  Luxury  Flats". They boasted outstanding views across Edinburgh, and offered a much better place to live than the slums of the inner city. However, a short while after their completion several problems were drawn into attention such as dampness, and after the 1970s the original families were beginning to move out of the blocks in search of other housing.

By the 1980s they had become a very undesirable and run-down place to live, drugs and crime blighted the tower blocks and the people that lived in them. Only the desperate came to live in them and by this time they contained very few families. Structurally, the towers were suffering from neglect and because of this they were steadily but rapidly falling into disrepair. But nonetheless a community spirit existed and in 2000 frustrated tenants of the towers decided to hold a meeting with the council to try to find out the long-term future of the flats. The council told them that nothing was possible for at least another 10 years and because of this the tenants held a campaign to have the flats demolished, and with the help of a local MSP they won it. In 2003, Social Justice Minister Margaret Curran announced £10,000,000 in funding for demolition of the blocks and rebuilding of affordable housing on the site.

Work began in 2003 with the decanting of Capelaw Court and by 2004 it was empty, finally being demolished (with the use of controlled explosives) on 17 April 2005. The demolition was screened live worldwide by the National Geographic Channel. Allermuir and Caerketton Court were next and they were both demolished within seconds of each other on 26 November 2006. On the site of Capelaw Court, 60 flats and 31 houses were built (managed by Dunedin Canmore Housing Association, Communities Scotland and the city council, in partnership). The first residents moved back to the new homes in early 2007. The site of the other two tower blocks is currently being developed into more housing. The whole project was due to be completed in around 2009/10.

Cultural references 
Singer-songwriter Kathy Muir wrote Like Warriors about her childhood in Capelaw Court. The video of the song includes photos and film footage of the Oxgangs high rise flats provided by other locals.

Gallery

References

External links 
 Village in the Sky. The Story of High Rise Living in Oxgangs

Housing estates in Edinburgh
1961 establishments in Scotland
Former skyscrapers
Residential skyscrapers in Scotland
Residential buildings completed in 1962
Buildings and structures demolished in 2006
2006 disestablishments in Scotland
Demolished buildings and structures in Scotland